Praia Grande crater is a  diameter circular feature in the Santos Basin offshore Brazil. It is a possible impact crater that has been identified on 3D seismic by Petrobras in 2004. Further investigation is needed to obtain more information on the structure. The Russian Academy of Sciences lists the structure as a probable impact crater.

Description 
The identification of this structure is based on the interpretation of three-dimensional seismic data, acquired and processed in 2004 for petroleum exploration in a Petrobras concession block in the Santos Basin. The principal morphological elements, imposed on Upper Cretaceous rocks, are a structural high in the center of the crater, an adjacent ring syncline, and, externally, several concentric circular listric normal faults.

Further investigation is needed to acquire data on shock metamorphism and shatter cones.

See also 

 List of possible impact structures on Earth
 List of impact craters in South America
 Santa Marta crater

References

Bibliography 
 
 
 
 
 

Impact craters of Brazil
Possible impact craters on Earth
Cretaceous impact craters
Cretaceous Brazil
Santonian Stage
Santos Basin